The men's singles badminton event at the 2011 Pan American Games was held October 15–20 at the Multipurpose Gymnasium in Guadalajara. The defending Pan American Games champion was Mike Beres of Canada, while the defending Pan American Championship champion was Stephan Wojcikiewicz, also of Canada. Beres retired after the 2008 Summer Olympics in Beijing, China.

The athletes were drawn into an elimination stage draw. Once a team lost a match it was no longer able to compete. Each match was contested as the best of three games.

The draw for the competition was done on October 7, 2011.

Seeds

   (champion)
   (third round)
   (quarterfinals)
   (semifinals)
  (third round)
  (third round)
  (quarterfinals)
  (quarterfinals)

Results

Finals

Top Half

Section 1

Section 2

Bottom Half

Section 3

Section 4

References

Men's draw with results

Men's Singles